Werner Krolikowski (born 12 March 1928) is an East German political official who became a senior politician. He was a member of the Central Committee of the ruling SED (party) politburo and a deputy chairman of the national Council of Ministers. He also produced a number of political publications.

Life

Early years
Werner Krolikowski was born into a working-class family. He trained for office work. By the time the war ended the frontier between Poland and Germany had moved west and Krolikowski, along with millions of other Germans, had also moved, the town of his birth now being part of Poland. In 1946 he joined the newly formed Socialist Unity Party of Germany (SED / Sozialistische Einheitspartei Deutschlands) in the Soviet occupation zone of what was left of Germany.

Party worker
He worked till 1950 for the council in the Malchin district, some 75 km (40 miles) south-east of Rostock, then from 1951 till 1952 for the regional party leadership at Mecklenburg. In 1952 he was appointed First Secretary of the party district leadership at Ribnitz-Damgarten on the north coast. Then, in December 1952, he was relieved of his functions "on account of gross breach of party rules".

Nevertheless, between 1953 and 1958 he was Second and then First Secretary to the party district leadership at Greifswald, then till 1960 he was secretary for Agitation and Propaganda for the party district leadership in the Rostock region in succession to Karl Zylla before, in 1973, moving to the other end of the country and taking a position as First Secretary of the Dresden district leadership, where his predecessor had been Fritz Reuter.

National politics
In 1963 Krolikowski became a member of the Party Central Committee, and in 1970 he became a member of the national People's Chamber ("Volkskammer"), where his responsibilities included membership of the assembly's National Defence Committee. In 1971 he joined the party politburo's central committee. Between 1973 and 1976 he was Secretary of the Party's Central Committee, and from 1976 right up till 1989 he was a member of the Economics Commission and of Central Committee Working Groups on the Balance of Payments and on inter-German Economic Relations. From 1976 till 1988 he was First Deputy Chairman of the German Democratic Republic's Ministerial Council. In 1988, following the sudden death of Werner Felfe (who had suffered the misfortune to be identified in western media as a possible successor to First Secretary Erich Honecker) Krolikowski regained the Central Committee secretaryship for agriculture.

Various reverses
In November 1989 The Wall came down.  In November 1989 Werner Krolikowski resigned from his various public offices and on 3 December 1989 he was expelled from what had till very recently been the unchallenged ruling party in East Germany. An investigation was launched, based on "suspicions of abuse of office and corruption" ("Verdachts auf Amtsmißbrauch u. Korruption"). In May 1990 he was charged with "misappropriation of state funds" ("Veruntreuung von Staatsgeldern") and arrested before being released on bail. However, the case was dropped on health grounds.

The ambassador's insight
The extent to which East Germany's leader Erich Honecker and his inner circle felt unsettled and undermined by on-going Perestroika in the Soviet Union became more widely known after Honecker himself had retired. The Soviet ambassador in East Berlin from 1983 till 1990 was a man called Vyacheslav Kochemasov, a diplomat whose experience of politics in Moscow and in East Berlin went back a long way. He gave an interview to the western press in 1992 in which he disclosed that as far back as 1986 Werner Krolikowski had told him, in confidence, that the situation in the SED Politburo had become "unbearable": policy decisions were totally driven by dogma, there was no longer any discussion, there was an absurd level of centralisation and an utterly implausible communications strategy. Something must be done: the leader must be replaced.

Werner's brother
Werner Krolikowski's elder brother, Herbert Krolikowski (1924-2012) was also an East German politician of eminence. Herbert never rose quite as far as Werner, but he did serve as East Germany's deputy foreign minister between 1963 and 1967 and again between 1975 and 1990.

Awards
 1964 Patriotic Order of Merit
 1970 Patriotic Order of Merit
 1978 Order of Karl Marx
 1980 Patriotic Order of Merit

After 1966 the "Patriotic Order of Merit", which Krolikowski received " ("for services to the people and the fatherland" ("Für Verdienste um Volk und Vaterland") was awarded at three different levels, designated respectively bronze, silver and gold, so that particularly long standing providers of exceptional service not infrequently won it more than once.

Publications 
 Zu einigen Fragen der Führungstätigkeit der Kreisleitungen der SED, Berlin 1972
 Der Kampf um die Verwirklichung der vom VIII. Parteitag beschlossenen Hauptaufgabe und die Bedeutung des wissenschaftlich-technischen Fortschritts, Berlin 1974
 Zu einigen Grundfragen der Wirtschaftspolitik der Sozialistischen Einheitspartei Deutschlands unter dem besonderen Blickpunkt der 13. Tagung des ZK der SED, Berlin 1975
 Für wachsende und wirksamere Solidaritätsleistungen, Berlin 1976
 Der IX. Parteitag der SED über die Fortsetzung des politischen Kurses der Hauptaufgabe. Die Einheit von Wirtschafts- und Sozialpolitik, Berlin 1976
 Die Intensivierung der gesellschaftlichen Produktion. Hauptweg der wirtschaftlichen Entwicklung der DDR, Leipzig 1977
 Die Verantwortung der sozialistischen Staatsmacht bei der Verwirklichung der Wirtschaftsstrategie des X. Parteitages der SED, Potsdam 1983
 DDR. Bollwerk des Sozialismus und Hort des Friedens, Potsdam 1984
 Je stärker der Sozialismus - desto sicherer der Frieden. Ausgewählte Reden und Aufsätze., Berlin 1988

References

1928 births
Living people
People from Oleśnica
People from the Province of Lower Silesia
Members of the Politburo of the Central Committee of the Socialist Unity Party of Germany
Government ministers of East Germany
Members of the State Council of East Germany
Members of the 4th Volkskammer
Members of the 5th Volkskammer
Members of the 6th Volkskammer
Members of the 7th Volkskammer
Members of the 8th Volkskammer
Members of the 9th Volkskammer
Free German Youth members
Recipients of the Patriotic Order of Merit